One Fish, Two Fish, Red Fish, Blue Fish is a 1960 children's book by Dr. Seuss. As of 2001, over six million copies of the book had been sold, placing it 13th on a list of "All-Time Bestselling Children's Books" from Publishers Weekly. Based on a 2007 online poll, the United States' National Education Association labor union listed the book as one of its "Teachers' Top 100 Books for Children".

It is a simple rhyming book for beginning readers, with a freewheeling plot about a boy and a girl named Jay and Kay and the many amazing creatures they have for friends and pets. Interspersed are some surreal and unrelated skits, such as a man named Ned whose feet stick out from his bed, a creature who has a bird in his ear, and one man named Joe who cannot hear the other man's call because of a mouse cutting the line.

Audio and video versions
Rik Mayall narrated this story as part of a HarperCollins audiobook that also includes The Lorax, Dr. Seuss's ABC and How the Grinch Stole Christmas!. One Fish Two Fish Red Fish Blue Fish was part of the Beginner Book Video series which included Oh, the Thinks You Can Think! and The Foot Book.

In other media
In the animated adaptation of Green Eggs and Ham, the titular fish are featured in the beginning of the episode "Train". When Sam, Guy and the Chickeraffe make their escape from a car barreling down a cliff, it lands in a lake where it promptly crushes a house belonging to a family of fish. Later in the episode as the mother checks on her own children, she specifically lists them off as "one fish, two fish, red fish and blue fish".

A preschool animated series based One Fish, Two Fish, Red Fish, Blue Fish is in development for Netflix.

In the 2022 horror film adaptation The Mean One, based on How the Grinch Stole Christmas!, the red fish and blue fish made an appearance in a fishbowl at the hospital.

In popular culture
 In the Supreme Court case, Yates v. United States (2015), Justice Elena Kagan cited the book in her dissent to support the argument that fish are tangible objects as defined in the Sarbanes-Oxley Act.
 A book titled One Dad, Two Dads, Brown Dad, Blue Dads was published in 1994, a parody of the title.
 The title of the 1991 episode of The Simpsons "One Fish, Two Fish, Blowfish, Blue Fish" is a clear parody of the title.
 The hook of rapper Chief Keef's 2015 single "Colors" parodies the title of the story.
 Similarly, the 2017 song "One Thot, Two Thot, Red Thot, Blue Thot" by rap artist Yung Gravy draws from the story's title parodically.

Theme park attraction 

The book was the basis of a theme park attraction located at Universal's Islands of Adventure in the Seuss Landing area of the park, called "One Fish, Two Fish, Red Fish, Blue Fish".

Selected translations
 Visje een visje twee visje visje in de zee (1960s, Dutch)
 Devarim muzarim korim ba-sefarim (1980, Hebrew)
 Yi tiao yu, liang tiao yu, hong de yu, lan de yu (1992, Chinese)
 Un pez, dos peces, pez rojo, pez azul (2006, Spanish)
 Eyn fish, tsvey fish, royter fish, bloyer fish (2007, Yiddish)
 Poisson un, poisson deux, poisson rouge, poisson bleu (2011, French)

References

1960 children's books
American picture books
Books by Dr. Seuss
Islands of Adventure
Universal Parks & Resorts attractions by name
Amusement rides introduced in 1999
Amusement rides manufactured by Zierer
Random House books